{{Infobox college lacrosse team
|name = Johns Hopkins Blue Jays women's lacrosse
|image = JHU "H" logo.png
|university = Johns Hopkins University 
|founded = 1976
|stadium = Homewood Field
|capacity = 8,500
|coach = Janine Tucker
|tenure = since 1994
|conference = Big Ten 
|division =
|location = Baltimore, Maryland
|pre_NCAA = 
|NCAA_champion = 
|NCAA_runner = 
|NCAA_semi = (5) - 1988*, 1993*, 1994*, 1995*, 1997*
|NCAA_quarter = (10) - 1987*, 1988*, 1989*, 1990*, 1993*, 1994*, 1995*, 1997*, 1998*, 2007
|NCAA_tourney = (19) - 1987*, 1988*, 1989*, 1990*, 1993*, 1994*, 1995*, 1997*, 1998*, 2004, 2005, 2007, 2014, 2015, 2016, 2018, 2019, 2021, 2022
|conf_tourney = (2) - 1989, 1990
|conf_champion = (9) - 1988, 1989, 1990, 1991, 1993, 1994, 1995, 1997, 1998
 ''*Division III''
}}

The Johns Hopkins Blue Jays Women's Lacrosse team''' represents Johns Hopkins University in the National Collegiate Athletic Association (NCAA) Division I women's college lacrosse competition. The Blue Jays play their home games at Homewood Field located on the school's Homewood campus in Baltimore, Maryland.

From the team's inception in 1976 through the 1998 season, the Blue Jays women competed at the NCAA Division III level. They switched to Division I starting in the 1999 season. The Blue Jays were members of the American Lacrosse Conference until its dissolution in 2014, competed as an independent during the 2015 and 2016 seasons, and officially joined the Big Ten on July 1, 2016, making the 2017 season the first season of Big Ten Conference play for the Blue Jays. The Blue Jays became the seventh women's lacrosse program in the conference.

On April 18th, 2021, Janine Tucker became just the 9th NCAA Division 1 Women's Lacrosse Coach to win 300 games with a 13–11 win at Penn State.

Season Results
The following is a list of Johns Hopkins's results by season since the institution of NCAA Division I in 1982:

{| class="wikitable"

|- align="center"

†NCAA canceled 2020 collegiate activities due to the COVID-19 pandemic.

References

External links
 

College women's lacrosse teams in the United States
Lacrosse, Women's
Lacrosse teams in Maryland
Lacrosse in Baltimore
1976 establishments in Maryland
Lacrosse clubs established in 1976